Rankin Inlet North-Chesterfield Inlet (Inuinnaqtun: Kangirliniq Tununga-Igluligaaryuk) is a territorial electoral district (riding) for the Legislative Assembly of Nunavut, Canada.

The riding consists of the communities of Chesterfield Inlet and part of Rankin Inlet. The district was created prior to the 28 October 2013 general election. The communities were previously in Nanulik and Rankin Inlet North.

Election results

2017 election

2013 election

References

Electoral districts of Kivalliq Region
2013 establishments in Nunavut